Europs is a genus of beetles in the family Monotomidae, containing the following species:

 Europs alutacea Champion, 1924
 Europs amabilis Grouvelle, 1899
 Europs apicalis Reitter, 1872
 Europs bilineatus Sharp, 1900
 Europs birmanica Grouvelle, 1897
 Europs brevis Grouvelle, 1896
 Europs calognathus Grouvelle, 1914
 Europs chilensis Grouvelle, 1896
 Europs cognatus Sharp, 1900
 Europs corticinus Grouvelle, 1896
 Europs crenicollis Grouvelle, 1906
 Europs depressus Grouvelle, 1896
 Europs diffusus Sharp, 1900
 Europs discedens Sharp, 1900
 Europs duplicatus Wollaston, 1862
 Europs euplectoides Sharp, 1900
 Europs fallax Grouvelle, 1902
 Europs fervida Blatchley, 1928
 Europs flavidus Bousquet, 2003
 Europs foveicollis Grouvelle & Raffray, 1908
 Europs frontalis Grouvelle, 1896
 Europs frugivorus Blatchley, 1928
 Europs germari Reitter, 1876
 Europs gestroi Grouvelle, 1906
 Europs horni Grouvelle, 1908
 Europs illaesus Sharp, 1900
 Europs impressicollis Wollaston, 1854
 Europs impressus Grouvelle, 1896
 Europs indica Grouvelle, 1903
 Europs kolbei Grouvelle, 1908
 Europs longulus Sharp, 1900
 Europs luridipennis (Reitter, 1876)
 Europs maculatus Grouvelle, 1896
 Europs mariae Grouvelle, 1906
 Europs multipunctatus Grouvelle, 1908
 Europs nanus Sharp, 1900
 Europs obtusus Sharp, 1900
 Europs oxytela Sharp, 1900
 Europs pallipennis (LeConte, 1861)
 Europs pumilio Sharp, 1900
 Europs raffrayi Grouvelle, 1896
 Europs rhizophagoides Reitter, 1872
 Europs simplex Sharp, 1900
 Europs sordidus Grouvelle, 1896
 Europs striatulus Fall in Fall & Cockerell, 1907
 Europs sulcicollis Bousquet, 2003
 Europs temporis Reitter, 1884
 Europs vicinus Grouvlle, 1896
 Europs wollastoni Reitter, 1872
 Europs zonatus Grouvelle, 1902

References

Monotomidae
Cucujoidea genera